Kathryn J. DuFour (March 19, 1910 — February 4, 2005) was the first female judge in the Maryland Circuit Courts. The law library at The Catholic University of America is named in her honor.

Early life and education

Born in Lawrence, Massachusetts, DuFour was a teenage actress, playing small roles for MGM and Fox Studios, until her mother forced her to stop acting and finish high school. After marrying a trial attorney and moving to Maryland, DuFour pursued law herself, graduating from the Washington College of Law at American University in 1935. After law school, she worked as a private attorney and for the Legal Aid Bureau and raised two children.

Career

In 1950 she was elected to the Montgomery County Council. In 1953 she was appointed to the Maryland General Assembly by Governor Theodore McKeldin. In 1955 she was appointed as a judge in the Maryland Sixth Judicial Circuit Court. In 1967 she became the first female chief judge on the same circuit.

References

Maryland state court judges
1910 births
2005 deaths
Washington College of Law alumni
20th-century American judges
20th-century American women judges
21st-century American women